The 2016 Dubai Duty Free Darts Masters was the fourth staging of the tournament organised by the Professional Darts Corporation. It was the first World Series of Darts event of 2016. The tournament featured eight of the top 10 players according to the PDC Order of Merit, competing in a knockout system. The tournament was held at the Dubai Tennis Centre in Dubai over 26–27 May 2016.

Gary Anderson won the title after he beat previously undefeated three-time champion Michael van Gerwen 11–9 in the final.

Prize money
The total prize fund was AED750,000.

Qualifiers
The eight players who qualified for this tournament are the same as last year's tournament, with the exception of Dave Chisnall replacing Stephen Bunting. These were:

Seeded players:
  Michael van Gerwen (Runner-up)
  Gary Anderson (Winner)
  Phil Taylor (Semi-finals)
  Adrian Lewis (Quarter-finals)

The next four seeded PDC players were (drawn at random against the higher seeds):
  Peter Wright (Quarter-finals)
  James Wade (Quarter-finals)
  Dave Chisnall (Semi-finals)
  Raymond van Barneveld (Quarter-finals)

Draw

Broadcasting
The tournament was available in the following territories on these channels.

References

Dubai Duty Free Darts Masters
Dubai Duty Free Darts Masters
2016 in Emirati sport
World Series of Darts